The Broward Center for the Performing Arts (commonly known as the Broward Center) is a large multi-venue performing arts center located in downtown Fort Lauderdale, Florida, United States.

Opened in 1991 on a  site along the north bank of the New River at Sailboat Bend, the center became a catalyst for major downtown revitalization efforts and an anchor of the Riverwalk Arts and Entertainment District.

Designed by Benjamin C. Thompson, the Broward Center hosts operas, ballets, concerts, plays, lectures and numerous community events in its four theaters. The Broward Center is partners in the arts with several organizations, including the Symphony of the Americas, Florida Grand Opera, Miami City Ballet, Concert Association of Florida, Gold Coast Jazz. National tours of Broadway productions are presented in partnership with Broadway Across America.

Broward Center for the Performing Arts is in the downtown riverfront area, in the South Florida region. In the process, it has also become one of the USA's most-visited theaters, ranked number four in the world by Venues Today and seven worldwide by concert trade publication Pollstar for annual sales in 2007.

As of 2011, the Broward Center receives over 700,000 patrons annually with over 700 different events. Plans were also announced for an expansion to the center to begin in spring 2012.

Architects and design team 
Architect: Benjamin Thompson and Associates, Inc., Cambridge, Massachusetts
Acoustician: Kirkegaard Associates, Chicago, Illinois
Theater Consultant: Jules Fisher Associates, New York, New York
Consulting Engineer: Spillis Candela & Partners, Inc., Miami, Florida

Historical development 
The Florida legislature in 1984 established the Performing Arts Center Authority (PACA) to oversee construction, then policy-making, at the Broward Center. The Downtown Development Authority, along with citizens, private sources, and the Broward Performing Arts Foundation worked together to raise the funding required to build the theater complex.

By the end of 1987, initial fundraising goals had been met and with supplementary grant monies from city, county, state, and national sources secured, the project went out to bid. The acclaimed Cambridge, Massachusetts architecture firm of Benjamin Thompson and Associates, Inc was selected to design the facility. A groundbreaking ceremony was held in May 1988 to initiate the building phase.

By early 1991 the  facility was completed at a cost of $54 million. The doors officially opened on February 26, 1991, with the first national tour of Andrew Lloyd Webber's The Phantom of the Opera. The tenth anniversary of the Broward Center was marked by retiring the entire building mortgage, 11 years ahead of schedule.

In 2007, from June 28-July 1, they premiered the Go, Diego, Go live. The Live was based on the episode titled "The Great Jaguar Rescue." The Broward Center for the Performing Arts was the last stop for the Go, Diego, Go live. It was one of the most popular art performances that ever happened.

Riverwalk Arts & Entertainment District 
In 1998, the Broward Center began a collaboration with neighboring merchants and cultural attractions along the New River that would evolve into the formation of the Riverwalk Arts and Entertainment District. This destination marketing organization features the Broward Center, The Museum of Art/Fort Lauderdale, Florida Grand Opera, Concert Association of Florida, Fort Lauderdale Historical Society, and Historic Stranahan House Museum. Formed to promote cultural tourism to Fort Lauderdale and to the Riverwalk District, in particular, more than 1 million ticketed visitors annually attend programming at the combined Arts & Entertainment District partner venues.

Expansion and management 
Broward Center management has taken a leadership role in strengthening arts throughout the community since its inception and that community-centered focus has resulted in several partnerships that have allowed the center to expand beyond its geographic borders in pursuit of its mission.

In 2004 Broward Center became a managing partner of the Rose and Alfred Miniaci Performing Arts Center, located on the campus of Nova Southeastern University. A year later, Broward Center assumed management of the historic 1100-seat Parker Playhouse in east Fort Lauderdale. In 2007, Broward Center was chosen as the creative consultants to help guide the emerging Miramar Cultural Center/Arts Park in western Broward County through its early development. It will now manage operations of this new 800-seat theater, scheduled to open in the fall of 2008.

Venues and facilities 
Performance venues at BCPA, on the New River (Himmarshee):

Au-Rene Theater, the main performance space for major international, national and regional productions, including Miami City Ballet, Concert Association of Florida, Florida Grand Opera and Broadway Across America touring companies.

Capacity: 2,658
Notable performances: The Phantom of the Opera (1991 and 2018), Tony Bennett (2007), Broadway's The Lion King (2002, 2007 and 2015), Whoopi Goldberg (2005), Renée Fleming (2006), Wicked (2008), k.d. lang (2008)
Seating structure: Orchestra, Mezzanine, and Balcony

Amaturo Theater, for dramatic productions as well as children's theater, film, community theater, choirs, chamber, jazz, folk and symphonic orchestras, seminars, and emerging dance companies.

Capacity: 584
Notable performances: Gold Coast Jazz, Symphony of the Americas, Capitol Steps, Second City Revue, Paula Poundstone, Jane Monheit

Abdo New River Room, a conference/banquet/performance facility available for various types of activities, such as cabaret, dinner theater, rehearsals, and speaker programs as well as for public and private receptions and events.

Capacity: 225 seated seminar/theater style; 200 banquet style:
Notable performances: Tony n’Tina's Wedding, Next Step Dance Theater, Laffing Matterz
Location: On the same Ft. Lauderdale campus with the Amaturo and Au-Rene theaters

Performance venues managed by BCPA 
Parker Playhouse a nearly 1,200-seat theater now managed by the Broward Center's governing authority, PACA, this space is for concerts, theatre, comedy, and dance.

Capacity: 1,147
Notable performances: In its initial heyday, Parker Playhouse hosted productions featuring Elizabeth Taylor, Faye Dunaway and James Earl Jones. Judy Collins (2006), Dixie Carter & Hal Holbrook, Southern Comforts (2006), Preservation Hall Jazz Band (2006), Marvin Hamlisch (2007), Tea at Five with Tovah Feldshuh (2006), Ladysmith Black Mambazo (2007)
Seating: Continental seating
Location: 707 NE 8th Street, Fort Lauderdale, FL 33304

Rose and Alfred Miniaci Performing Arts Center, equipped with lighting and acoustics, and a satellite downlink for viewing broadcast and transmitted productions, this hall is used for many types of community events, corporate gatherings, lectures and children's productions.

Capacity: 498
Seating: 399 orchestra, 99 balcony
Location: On the campus of Nova Southeastern University, 3100 Ray Ferrero Jr. Blvd., Fort Lauderdale

Awards and distinctions 
 Mark Nerenhausen, President and CEO of the Broward Center for the Performing Arts, picked up a Silver Medallion Award from the National Conference for Community and Justice March 2007
 Designated a "Point of Culture" by the Brazilian Ministry of Culture, January 2006

Notes

Buildings and structures in Fort Lauderdale, Florida
Culture of Fort Lauderdale, Florida
Theatres in Florida
Performing arts centers in Florida
Tourist attractions in Fort Lauderdale, Florida
1991 establishments in Florida
Event venues established in 1991